The 1916 Copa de Competencia Jockey Club was the final that decided the champion of the 10th. edition of this National cup of Argentina. In the match, held in Racing Club Stadium in Avellaneda on December 17, 1916, Rosario Central defeated Club Atlético Independiente 2–1.

Qualified teams

Overview 
The 1916 edition was contested by 24 clubs, 22 within Buenos Aires Province and 2 from Liga Rosarina de Football (Rosario Central and Central Córdoba) that entered directly to the semifinal. In that stage, Rosario Central beat River Plate (1–1, 1–0 in playoff)

On the other hand, Independiente, starting in group of 16, beat Belgrano A.C. 3–0, Estudiantes de La Plata 3–2, and Columbian (1–1, 3–2 in playoff) in the semifinal.

Match details

References

J
J
1916 in Argentine football
Football in Avellaneda